The first season of Gidi Up was originally broadcast on ndani.tv in 2013; the first episode aired on 20 February 2013 and the concluding episode on 16 April 2013. The season is directed by Jadesola Osiberu and it consists of eight episodes, each with a length of not more than ten minutes. The season shows "how Tokunbo, Eki, Yvonne and Obi deal with love, sex and making a living in one of Africa's biggest cities". The second season of the series however has a length of thirty minutes per episode and was broadcast on television; all the episodes of season 1 was combined as a 52-minute pilot episode for the second season on television.

Plot summary
Obi (Karibi Fubara) is a budding radio presenter. He is offered a huge television contract and as a result, he borrows a loan from a thug to acquire an apartment on the Island with a friend, Tokunbo (Deyemi Okanlawon) and to buy a car, amongst other things, hoping that when he gets his pay for the television project, he'd pay back the loan in no time. However, things doesn't go as planned when he is shown the documents, as his pay for the first season of the show is very low and not enough to do anything. The time of payment gets due and Obi ends up being constantly issued threats from his creditor.

Yvonne (Somkele Iyamah) is an upcoming fashion designer who is very determined to get what she wants. She starts up a fashion brand; "Vone" with the help of an aristo; Chief Jagun (Bimbo Manuel) who is very possessive. Things eventually turns sour as Yvonne ends her relationship with the chief, which makes Chief's personal assistant; Folarin (Daniel Effiong) to lose his job. Folarin attacks Yvonne as a revenge and is captured by the Police.

Tokunbo (Adeyemi Okanlawon) is having problems with his father regarding his career interest and he eventually leaves home to live together with Obi. Eki (Oreka Godis) also leaves her home because her parents do not support her dreams to pursue a career in Photography, a dream she's passionate about. She meets Tokunbo and they both fall in love.

Cast and characters

Main characters
Oreka Gordis as Eki (8 episodes)
Karibi Fubara as Obi (7 episodes) 
Deyemi Okanlawon as Tokunbo Adepoju (7 episodes)
Somkele Iyamah as Yvonne (6 episodes)

Supporting characters
Daniel Effiong as Folarin (4 episodes)
KC Ejelonu as Sharon Olaitan Jagun (4 episodes)
Makida Moka as Monye (3 episodes) 
Udoka Oyeka as Creditor (2 episodes)
Sean Amadi as Derrick (2 episodes) 
Abiodun Kassim as Charles (1 episode)
Seun Ajayi (1 episode)

Guest stars
Maria Okanrende as Maria (2 episodes) 
Najite Dede as Ade (2 episodes)
Segun Arinze as Lanre (2 episodes)
Bimbo Manuel as Chief Jagun (1 episode)
Burna Boy as Burna Boy (1 episode)
Temi Dollface as Temi Dollface (1 episode)
Lynxxx as Lynxxx (1 episode)

Music and soundtracks
The series features independently produced songs.

Track listing

Promotions
The trailer for season 1 was released on 7 February 2013. Along with the trailer, character posters were also released to the public, describing the role of each cast member.

Reception
The first season of Gidi Up was generally met with mixed reception. It was praised for its beautiful cinematography and high production values, but criticized for its shallow storyline and the poor performance from the actors. Maryam Kazeem of OkayAfrica comments: "The production quality of this show is amazing. The cinematography depicts a visually beautiful Lagos, which we don't see enough...We love that the series highlights young Nigerians pursuing careers that aren't the typical professions. Rather we get to watch young creatives pursuing their unconventional and artistic careers and it definitely adds an extra layer to the show".

Episodes

{| class="wikitable plainrowheaders" style="width:100%; background-color:#FFFFFF"
|- style="color:white"
! style="background:#A92020;" width="20" | No. inseries
! style="background:#A92020;" width="20" | No. inseason
! style="background:#A92020;"| Title
! style="background:#A92020;"| Directed by
! style="background:#A92020;"| Written by
! style="background:#A92020;" width="130" | Original air date
! style="background:#A92020;" width="50" | Length
|-

|}

See also 

 Gidi Up (season 2)

References

External links

2013 Nigerian television seasons
Gidi Up